NGC 6304 is a globular cluster in the constellation Ophiuchus. William Herschel discovered this star cluster using an  f/13 speculum reflector telescope in 1786.  It is about 19,000 light-years away, near the Milky Way's central bulge.

See also
 NGC object
 List of NGC objects
 List of NGC objects (6001–7000)

References

External links
 
 NED – NGC 6304
 SEDS – NGC 6304
 SIMBAD – NGC 6304
 VizieR – NGC 6304

Globular clusters
Ophiuchus (constellation)
6304